The mayor of Butuan is the chief executive of the city government of Butuan in Mindanao, Philippines. The mayor leads the city's departments in executing ordinances and delivering public services. The mayorship is a three-year term and each mayor is restricted to three consecutive terms, totaling nine years, although a mayor can be elected again after an interruption of one term.

Butuan Mayors and Vice Mayors

See also
 Legislative districts of Agusan del Norte
 Councilors of Butuan

References

External links
 Butuan government website

Butuan
Politics of Butuan